Sir Michael Anthony Eardley Dummett  (27 June 1925 – 27 December 2011) was an English academic described as "among the most significant British philosophers of the last century and a leading campaigner for racial tolerance and equality." He was, until 1992, Wykeham Professor of Logic at the University of Oxford. He wrote on the history of analytic philosophy, notably as an interpreter of Frege, and made original contributions particularly in the philosophies of mathematics, logic, language and metaphysics. He was known for his work on truth and meaning and their implications to debates between realism and anti-realism, a term he helped to popularize. He devised the Quota Borda system of proportional voting, based on the Borda count. In mathematical logic, he developed an intermediate logic, already studied by Kurt Gödel: the Gödel–Dummett logic.

Education and army service
Born 27 June 1925 at his parents' house, 56, York Terrace, Marylebone, London, Dummett was the son of George Herbert Dummett (1880 – 12 November 1969), later of Shepherd's Cottage, Curridge, Berkshire, a silk merchant and rayon dealer, and Mabel Iris (1893–1980), daughter of the civil servant and conservationist Sir Sainthill Eardley-Wilmot (himself grandson of the politician Sir John Eardley-Wilmot, 1st Baronet). He studied at Sandroyd School in Wiltshire, at Winchester College as a scholar, and at Christ Church, Oxford, which awarded him a major scholarship in 1943. He was called up for military service that year and served until 1947, first as a private in the Royal Artillery, then in the Intelligence Corps in India and Malaya. In 1950 he graduated with a first in Politics, Philosophy and Economics from Oxford and was elected a Prize Fellow of All Souls College, Oxford.

Academic career
In 1979, Dummett became Wykeham Professor of Logic at Oxford, a post he held until retiring in 1992. During his term as Wykeham Professor, he held a Fellowship at New College, Oxford. He has also held teaching posts at Birmingham University, UC Berkeley, Stanford University, Princeton University, and Harvard University. He won the Rolf Schock prize in 1995, and was knighted in 1999. He was the 2010 winner of the Lauener Prize for an Outstanding Œuvre in Analytical Philosophy.

During his career at Oxford, Dummett supervised many philosophers who went on to distinguished careers, including Peter Carruthers, Adrian Moore, Ian Rumfitt, and Crispin Wright.

Philosophical work
Dummett's work on the German philosopher Frege has been acclaimed. His first book Frege: Philosophy of Language (1973), written over many years, is seen as a classic. It was instrumental in the rediscovery of Frege's work, and influenced a generation of British philosophers.

In his 1963 paper "Realism", he popularised a controversial approach to understanding the historical dispute between realist and other non-realist philosophy such as idealism, nominalism, irrealism. He classed all the latter as anti-realist and argued that the fundamental disagreement between realist and anti-realist was over the nature of truth.

For Dummett, realism is best understood as semantic realism, i.e. the view that every declarative sentence in one's language is bivalent (determinately true or false) and evidence-transcendent (independent of our means of coming to know which), while anti-realism rejects this view in favour of a concept of knowable (or assertible) truth. Historically, these debates had been understood as disagreements about whether a certain type of entity objectively exists or not. Thus we may speak of realism or anti-realism with respect to other minds, the past, the future, universals, mathematical entities (such as natural numbers), moral categories, the material world, or even thought. The novelty of Dummett's approach consisted in seeing these disputes as at base analogous to the dispute between intuitionism and Platonism in the philosophy of mathematics.

Dummett espoused semantic anti-realism, a position suggesting that truth cannot serve as the central notion in the theory of meaning and must be replaced by verifiability. Semantic anti-realism is sometimes related to semantic inferentialism.

Activism
Dummett was politically active, through his work as a campaigner against racism. He let his philosophical career stall in order to influence civil rights for minorities during what he saw as a crucial period of reform in the late 1960s. He also worked on the theory of voting, which led to his introduction of the Quota Borda system.

Dummett drew heavily on his work in this area in writing his book On Immigration and Refugees, an account of what justice demands of states in relationship to movement between states. Dummett, in that book, argues that the vast majority of opposition to immigration has been founded on racism, and says that this has especially been so in the UK.

He has written of his shock on finding anti-Semitic and fascist opinions in the diaries of Frege, to whose work he had devoted such a high proportion of his professional career.

In 1955–1956, while in Berkeley, California, Dummett and his wife joined the NAACP. In June 1956 he met Martin Luther King Jr. while visiting San Francisco, and heard from him of Alistair Cooke providing the British public with what King defined as "biased and hostile reports" of the Civil Rights Movement and specifically of the Montgomery bus boycott. Dummett travelled to Montgomery and wrote his own account. However, The Guardian refused to publish Dummett's article and his refutation of Cooke's version of the Montgomery events, even in a shortened account as a Letter to the Editor; the BBC, too, also refused to publish it.

Elections and voting

Dummett and Robin Farquharson published influential articles on the theory of voting, in particular conjecturing that deterministic voting rules with more than three issues faced endemic strategic voting. The Dummett–Farquharson conjecture was proved by Allan Gibbard, a philosopher and former student of Kenneth J. Arrow and John Rawls, and by the economist Mark A. Satterthwaite.

After the establishment of the Farquharson–Dummett conjecture by Gibbard and Satterthwaite, Dummett contributed three proofs of the Gibbard–Satterthwaite theorem in a monograph on voting. He also wrote a shorter overview of the theory of voting, for the educated public.

Card games and tarot
Dummett was a scholar in the field of card-game history, with numerous books and articles to his credit. He was a founding member of the International Playing-Card Society, in whose journal The Playing-Card he regularly published opinions, research and reviews of current literature on the subject; he was also a founder of the Accademia del Tarocchino Bolognese in Bologna. His historical work on the use of the tarot pack in card games, The Game of Tarot: From Ferrara to Salt Lake City, attempted to establish that the invention of Tarot could be set in 15th-century Italy. He laid the foundation for most subsequent research on the game of tarot, including exhaustive accounts of the rules of all hitherto known forms of the game. B.M. Taylor goes as far as to say that The Game of Tarot "is the most important book on cards ever written."

Dummett's analysis of the historical evidence suggested that fortune-telling and occult interpretations were unknown before the 18th century. During most of their recorded history, he wrote, Tarot cards were used to play a popular trick-taking game which is still enjoyed in much of Europe. Dummett showed that the middle of the 18th century saw a great development in the game of Tarot, including a modernized deck with French suit-signs, and without the medieval allegories that interest occultists. This coincided with a growth in Tarot's popularity. "The hundred years between about 1730 and 1830 were the heyday of the game of Tarot; it was played not only in northern Italy, eastern France, Switzerland, Germany and Austro-Hungary, but also in Belgium, the Netherlands, Denmark, Sweden and even Russia. Not only was it, in these areas, a famous game with many devotees: it was also, during that period, more truly an international game than it had ever been before or than it has ever been since...."

In 1987, Dummett collaborated with Giordano Berti and Andrea Vitali on the project of a great Tarot exhibition at Castello Estense in Ferrara. On that occasion he wrote some texts for the catalogue of the exhibition.

Roman Catholicism
In 1944, Dummett was received into the Roman Catholic Church and remained a practising Catholic. Throughout his career, Dummett published articles on various issues then facing the Catholic Church, mainly in the English Dominican journal New Blackfriars. Dummett published an essay in the bulletin of the Adoremus Society on the subject of liturgy, and a philosophical essay defending the intelligibility of the Catholic Church's teaching on the Eucharist.

In October 1987, one of his contributions to New Blackfriars sparked controversy by seemingly attacking currents of Catholic theology that appeared to him to diverge from orthodox Catholicism and "imply that, from the very earliest times, the Catholic Church, claiming to have a mission from God to safeguard divinely revealed truth, has taught and insisted on the acceptance of falsehoods." Dummett argued that "the divergence which now obtains between what the Catholic Church purports to believe and what large or important sections of it in fact believe ought, in my view, to be tolerated no longer: not if there is to be a rationale for belonging to that Church; not if there is to be any hope of reunion with the other half of Christendom; not if the Catholic Church is not to be a laughing-stock in the eyes of the world." A debate on these remarks continued for months, with the theologian Nicholas Lash and the historian Eamon Duffy among the contributors.

Later years and family
Dummett retired in 1992 and was knighted in 1999 for "services to philosophy and to racial justice". He received the Lakatos Award in the philosophy of science in 1994.

Dummett died on 27 December 2011 aged 86, leaving his wife Ann (married in 1951, died in 2012) and three sons and two daughters. A son and a daughter predeceased them.

Works
On analytical philosophy and logic:
Frege: Philosophy of Language (Harvard University Press, 1973/1981)
The Interpretation of Frege's Philosophy, Duckworth, 1981; Harvard University Press
Elements of Intuitionism (Oxford, 1977, 2000) 
Truth and Other Enigmas (Harvard University Press, 1978)
Frege: Philosophy of Mathematics (Harvard University Press, 1991)
The Logical Basis of Metaphysics (Harvard University Press, 1991)
Origins of Analytical Philosophy (Harvard University Press, 1993)
The Seas of Language (Oxford, 1993)
Frege and Other Philosophers (Oxford, 1991)
Truth and the Past (Oxford, 2005)
Thought and Reality (Oxford, 2006)
The Nature and Future of Philosophy (Columbia, 2010)
On voting theory and election systems:
Voting Procedures (Oxford, 1984)
Principles of Electoral Reform (New York, 1997) 

On politics:
On Immigration and Refugees (London, 2001)
Tarot works:
The Game of Tarot: from Ferrara to Salt Lake City (Duckworth, 1980)
Twelve Tarot Games (Duckworth, 1980)
The Visconti-Sforza Tarot Cards (G. Braziller, 1986)
Il mondo e l'angelo: i tarocchi e la loro storia (Bibliopolis, 1993)
I tarocchi siciliani (La Zisa, 1995)
A Wicked Pack of Cards: The Origins of the Occult Tarot (with Ronald Decker and Thierry Depaulis, St. Martin's Press, 1996)
A History of the Occult Tarot, 1870-1970 (with Ronald Decker, Duckworth, 2002)
A History of Games Played with the Tarot Pack (with John McLeod, E. Mellen Press, 2004)

Notable articles and exhibition catalogues include "Tarot Triumphant: Tracing the Tarot" in FMR, (Franco Maria Ricci International), January/February 1985; Pattern Sheets published by the International Playing Card Society; with Giordano Berti and Andrea Vitali, the catalogue Tarocchi: Gioco e magia alla Corte degli Estensi (Bologna, Nuova Alfa Editorale, 1987).

On the written word:
Grammar and Style (Duckworth, 1993)

See also
"Is Logic Empirical?", which discusses an article by Dummett on an argument of Hilary Putnam for the correctness of quantum logic
Truth-value link realism, which Dummett criticized in early works

Notes

References

Further reading
Johannes L Brandl and Peter Sullivan (eds.) New Essays on the Philosophy of Michael Dummett. Rodopi, 1999. 
Richard Kirkham. Theories of Truth. MIT Press, 1992. Chapter 8 is a discussion of Dummett's views on meaning.
Karen Green. Dummett: Philosophy of Language. Polity, 2001. 
Richard G. Heck (ed.) Language, Thought, and Logic: Essays in Honour of Michael Dummett. Oxford University Press, 1998. 
Bernhard Weiss. Michael Dummett. Princeton University Press, 2002. 
Anat Matar. From Dummett's Philosophical Perspective, Walter de Gruyter, 1997. 
R. E. Auxier and L. E. Hahn (eds.) The Philosophy of Michael Dummett, The Library of Living Philosophers, vol XXXI Open Court, Chicago, 2007.

Bibliography 
 Taylor, B.M. (1987). Michael Dummett: Contributions to Philosophy. Dordrecht, Boston, Lancaster: Nijhoff.

External links

Michael Dummett at the Internet Encyclopedia of Philosophy
Biographical notes at Trionfi
Philosophy Bites interview with Dummett on Frege
"Remembering Michael Dummett", at The Stone, New York Times blogs, 4 January 2012
"Sir Michael Dummett obituary" by A. W. Moore, The Guardian, 28 December 2011
The Philosophical Basis Of Intuitionistic Logic by Michael DUMMETT of University of Oxford, U.K.; posted online by Prof. Alessandro Zucchi of University of Milan's Department of Philosophy

1925 births
2011 deaths
20th-century English male writers
20th-century English philosophers
20th-century essayists
20th-century English mathematicians
21st-century English male writers
21st-century English philosophers
21st-century essayists
Academics of the University of Birmingham
Alumni of Christ Church, Oxford
Analytic philosophers
British activists
British anti-fascists
British anti-racism activists
British Army personnel of World War II
British human rights activists
British male essayists
British Roman Catholics
Card game book writers
Card game historians
Card game personalities
Catholic philosophers
Converts to Roman Catholicism
English activists
English anti-fascists
English essayists
English human rights activists
English logicians
English male non-fiction writers
English Roman Catholics
Epistemologists
Fellows of All Souls College, Oxford
Fellows of New College, Oxford
Fellows of the British Academy
Free speech activists
Historians of philosophy
History of logic
Intelligence Corps soldiers
Intuitionism
Knights Bachelor
Lakatos Award winners
Metaphysicians
Metaphysics writers
Ontologists
People educated at Sandroyd School
People educated at Winchester College
Philosophers of language
Philosophers of logic
Philosophers of mathematics
Philosophers of science
Philosophers of social science
Philosophy academics
Political philosophers
Rolf Schock Prize laureates
Royal Artillery soldiers
Semanticists
Social commentators
Social philosophers
Tarock card games
Tarot card games
Voting theorists
Wittgensteinian philosophers
Writers about activism and social change
Writers from London
Wykeham Professors of Logic